Spiridon Sobol  (Belarusian: Спірыдо́н Міро́навіч Со́баль, Russian: Спиридо́н Миро́нович Со́боль) (1580—1590, Mogilev − 1645, Muntenia) was a Belarusian printer and educator. Sobol was the first East Slavic printer to use copper etching (for the title page of Octoechos, 1628). His name is associated with the printing house in Kuciejna, near Orsha, which he founded in 1630.

Biography

Spiridon Sobol was born in the city of Mogilyov (now Belarus). He knew Greek and Latin languages and taught in a brotherhood school in Kiev. Sobol printed books in Mogilyov, Kiev (where he was supported by metropolitan Job Boretsky), Kutejno, Bujnichi, and in present day Romania. He published more than 20 editions, including an early «bukvar» (alphabet book). Late in life he became a monk in the Kiev-Pechersk Lavra.

See also

Symon Budny
Ivan Fedorov
Johann Gutenberg
Francysk Skaryna
Spread of the printing press

Sources 
 Зернова А. С. Белорус, печатник С. Соболь // Книга: Исслед.и материалы. 1965. Сб.10;
 Исаевич Я. Д. Преемники первопечатника. М., 1981.

External link

People from Mogilev
1645 deaths
Year of birth unknown
Belarusian printers